Le Baiser Salé (French for "The Salty Kiss") is a jazz club in Paris, at 58, rue des Lombards, that opened in 1983. It was founded by the Gibson brothers.

Musicians such as, Richard Bona, Angélique Kidjo, Monica Passos, Ultramarine, Les Étoiles, Sylvain Luc, Rido Bayonne, Leni Stern, Thierry Eliez, Etienne Mbappé, Mario Canonge, Nguyen Le, and others have played at Le Baiser Salé.

See also
List of jazz clubs

External links
Official site

Jazz clubs in Paris
1983 establishments in France